Sound of My Voice is a 2011 American psychological thriller film directed by Zal Batmanglij in his feature directorial debut and starring Christopher Denham, Nicole Vicius and Brit Marling. The plot focuses on two documentary filmmakers who attempt to expose a cult led by a charismatic leader (Marling) who claims to be from the future. The film was written by Batmanglij and Marling. It premiered at the 2011 Sundance Film Festival. It was also selected to close the 2011 SXSW Film Festival. The film was released by Fox Searchlight Pictures on April 27, 2012.

Plot
In Los Angeles, substitute schoolteacher Peter and aspiring writer Lorna are a couple in their twenties making a film documentary. Their subject is a secretive cult led by the mysterious Maggie, whom they plan to expose as a fraud.

When the cult considers Peter and Lorna ready to meet Maggie, they are made to shower thoroughly and dress in white surgical gowns. Then they are driven blindfolded to a secret basement location and received by Klaus, with whom they exchange a distinctive, intricate handshake, which they have been practicing. Peter and Lorna then join eight other members and meet Maggie, who uses an oxygen tank and implies that the showering and clothing requirements are to avoid aggravating her illness.

Maggie claims to be a time-traveler from the year 2054. She describes the future as riddled with war, famine and struggle, and has come back to select a special band of chosen people to prepare for what lies ahead. She leads the group in a series of intense psychological exercises and tells them about herself and the future, never proving nor disproving her extraordinary claim. Maggie's charismatic manner is powerful, and both Lorna and Peter have moments in which they waver between skepticism and belief. Lorna is especially concerned when she notices that Peter, who was initially adamant that Maggie was a charlatan, seems to now be intrigued by and even attracted to Maggie.

After several group meetings, Maggie instructs Peter to bring her the eccentric eight-year-old Abigail Pritchett, one of his students. Maggie insists Abigail is her mother, and that Peter and Lorna will be banned from the group if he fails to comply. When Peter admits that he is considering following Maggie's orders, Lorna is outraged and accuses him of falling for Maggie's deception. After they argue, Lorna is privately approached by Carol, a woman who identifies herself as a Justice Department agent. Carol tells Lorna that Maggie is wanted for a variety of felonies. Lorna agrees to set Maggie up to be captured and to hide this plan from Peter.

With Lorna's help Peter arranges for Maggie to meet the student in public, at the LaBrea Tar Pits, during a class field trip. When Maggie meets the little girl, Peter is amazed to see them wordlessly perform the cult's intricate handshake. Abigail asks Maggie how she knew her secret handshake, and Maggie reverently responds: "You taught it to me." Men in police uniforms burst into the room and seize Maggie. As cult members angrily accuse Peter of betraying Maggie, he exchanges a glance with Lorna who smiles slightly, affirming her role in Maggie's capture. Abigail then asks Peter who Maggie was, and he responds, stricken, that he does not know.

Cast

 Christopher Denham as Peter Aitken
 Jack Griffo as Young Peter
 Nicole Vicius as Lorna Michaelson
 Brit Marling as Maggie
 Davenia McFadden as Carol Briggs
 Kandice Stroh as Joanne
 Richard Wharton as Klaus
 Christy Myers as Mel
 Alvin Lam as Lam
 Constance Wu as Christine
 Matthew Carey as Lyle
 Jacob Price as PJ
 David Haley as O'Shea
 James Urbaniak as Mr. Pritchett
 Avery Pohl as Abigail Pritchett
 Kyle Hacker as Lucas

Reception
Sound of My Voice was named among the Top Indie Films at Festivals in 2011 on IndieWire's criticWIRE.

On review aggregator Rotten Tomatoes the film has a 75% approval rating from critics based on 104 reviews.

Manohla Dargis wrote in her review in The New York Times: "Nobody is gutted in Sound of My Voice, a smart, effectively unsettling movie about the need to believe and the hard, cruel arts of persuasion. But over time the men and women who meet in a mysterious house in an anonymous Los Angeles neighborhood – where they shed their clothes and cleanse their bodies in a ritual – are opened up bit by bit, wound by wound, until they’re sobbing and laughing, their insides smeared across the carpet."

Brent Simon, a film critic, summed up Sound of My Voice as, "a delicate, mesmeric thing that dances darkly along the edges of psychology, religion and science-fiction, raising questions about faith, identity, self-betterment and romantic connection."

In September 2012, the film won the Octopus d’Or for the best international feature film at the Strasbourg European Fantastic Film Festival.

In his round-up of 2012's cinematic standouts, Variety film critic Peter Debruge admitted to having watched Sound of My Voice four times and called it an "ingenious low-budget puzzler."

Planned follow-ups
The film was originally intended to be the first installment of a trilogy.

See also
The East (2013 film)
The OA (television series)

References

External links
 
 
 
 
 

2011 films
2011 independent films
2011 psychological thriller films
Fiction set in 2054
American psychological thriller films
Films about cults
Fictional cults
Fox Searchlight Pictures films
Films about filmmaking
Films directed by Zal Batmanglij
Films set in 2010
Films set in Los Angeles
Films shot in Los Angeles
2011 directorial debut films
2010s English-language films
2010s American films